The 1953 Brooklyn Dodgers repeated as National League champions by posting a 105–49 record. However, Brooklyn again failed to capture the World Series, losing in six games to the American League champion New York Yankees.

The Dodgers' .682 winning percentage in 1953 stood as the best single-season winning percentage in franchise history until 2020, when the Dodgers posted a .717 mark (43–17) during a shortened 60-game season.

Offseason 
 October 10, 1952: Dixie Howell was purchased by the Dodgers from the Cincinnati Reds.
 October 10, 1952: Clyde King was purchased from the Dodgers by the Cincinnati Reds.
 October 14, 1952: Billy Hunter was traded by the Dodgers to the St. Louis Browns for Ray Coleman, Stan Rojek, Bob Mahoney and cash.
 January 17, 1953: Andy Pafko was traded by the Dodgers to the Milwaukee Braves for Roy Hartsfield and cash.
 February 16, 1953: The Dodgers traded Rocky Bridges to the Cincinnati Reds and Jim Pendleton to the Milwaukee Braves as part of a four-team trade. The Philadelphia Phillies sent Russ Meyer to the Dodgers. The Braves sent cash to the Reds and Earl Torgeson to the Phillies. The Reds sent Joe Adcock to the Braves, and the Phillies sent cash to the Braves.

Regular season 
Duke Snider had a hitting streak of 27 games.

Season standings

Record vs. opponents

Opening Day Lineup

Notable transactions 
 May 25, 1953: Bud Byerly was traded by the Dodgers to the New York Giants for Norman Fox (minors).

Roster

Player stats

Batting

Starters by position 
Note: Pos = Position; G = Games played; AB = At bats; H = Hits; Avg. = Batting average; HR = Home runs; RBI = Runs batted in

Other batters 
Note: G = Games played; AB = At bats; H = Hits; Avg. = Batting average; HR = Home runs; RBI = Runs batted in

Pitching

Starting pitchers 
Note: G = Games pitched; IP = Innings pitched; W = Wins; L = Losses; ERA = Earned run average; SO = Strikeouts

Other pitchers 
Note: G = Games pitched; IP = Innings pitched; W = Wins; L = Losses; ERA = Earned run average; SO = Strikeouts

Relief pitchers 
Note: G = Games pitched; W = Wins; L = Losses; SV = Saves; ERA = Earned run average; SO = Strikeouts

1953 World Series

Game 1 
September 30, 1953, at Yankee Stadium in New York

Game 2 
October 1, 1953, at Yankee Stadium in New York

Game 3 
October 2, 1953, at Ebbets Field in Brooklyn, New York

Game 4 
October 3, 1953, at Ebbets Field in Brooklyn, New York

Game 5 
October 4, 1953, at Ebbets Field in Brooklyn, New York

Game 6 
October 5, 1953, at Yankee Stadium in New York

Awards and honors 
National League Most Valuable Player
Roy Campanella
National League Rookie of the Year
Jim Gilliam
TSN Player of the Year Award
Roy Campanella
TSN NL Rookie of the Year Award
Jim Gilliam

All-Stars 
1953 Major League Baseball All-Star Game
Roy Campanella, starter, catcher
Pee Wee Reese, starter, shortstop
Carl Furillo, reserve
Gil Hodges, reserve
Jackie Robinson, reserve
Duke Snider, reserve
TSN Major League All-Star Team
Roy Campanella, catcher
Carl Furillo, outfield
Duke Snider, outfield
Pee Wee Reese, shortstop

Farm system 

LEAGUE CHAMPIONS: Montreal

Notes

References 
Baseball-Reference season page
Baseball Almanac season page

External links 
1953 Brooklyn Dodgers uniform
Brooklyn Dodgers reference site
Acme Dodgers page 
Retrosheet

 
Los Angeles Dodgers seasons
Brooklyn Dodgers season
National League champion seasons
Jackie Robinson
Brooklyn Dodgers
1950s in Brooklyn
Flatbush, Brooklyn